Povindah was the name of a class of warrior nomadic traders in present-day Afghanistan and north-western Pakistan, who belonged chiefly to the tribes of Ghilzais. Their name, which designates their occupation, is derived from the same root as the Pushtu word for to graze.

They were almost wholly engaged in the carrying trade between present-day India, Pakistan, Afghanistan and Central Asia. They assembled every autumn in the plains east of Ghazni, with their families, flocks, herds and long strings of camels and horses, laden with the goods of Bokhara and Kandahar; and forming caravans march through the Kakar and Waziri countries by the Zhob and Gumal passes of the Suliman Hills.

Entering Dera Ismail Khan district about October they leave their families and flocks, their arms and some two-thirds of their fighting men, in the great grazing grounds which lie on either side of the Indus, and while some wander in search of employment, others pass on with their merchandise to the great cities of India, and even by rail as far as Calcutta, Karachi and Bombay. In the spring they again. assemble, and return by the same route to their homes in the hills about Ghazni and Kalat-i-Ghilzai. When the hot season begins, the men, leaving their belongings behind them, move off again to Kandahar, Herat and Bokhara, with the Indian and European merchandise which they have brought from Hindustan. For generations the Waziris have carried on war to the knife with these merchant traders. To meet the opposition that awaited them on the road the Povindahs used to move heavily armed, in bodies of from 5000 to 10,000, and regular marches and encampments were observed under an elected khan or leader. But since the Gumal Pass was taken over by the British and opened up in 1889 there has been comparative security on the border.

Powindah tribes

List of Povindah clans

Ghilzai
 Nasar is Pashtun ethnic Khillji Tribe, mainly living in Afghanistan and Pakistan. The most famous General Saidal Khan Nasar who Fought with Persian along with Mirwais Baba as Chief of Army and overcome Isfahan, Modern days popular politicians in Pakistan namely Mullana Fazal u Rehman, Sardar Yaqoob Khan Nasar.
Ahmadzai

The Ahmadzai (Pashto: احمدزی) is a Pashtun subtribe of the Ghilji confederacy. Ahmadzai Pashtun tribe is a Powandah tribe and are traditional nomadic merchant warriors.

Hotak

Niazi:

Kharoti

See also
 Niazi
 Lohani

External links
Indian Merchants and Eurasian Trade, 1600-1750 By Stephen Frederic Dale
A British Tale of Indian and Foreign Service By Ian Scott, Denis Judd Page 120
A British  Tale of Indian and Foreign Service By Ian Scott, Denis Judd

References

Pashtun tribes